Portugal competed at the 1968 Summer Olympics in Mexico City, Mexico. 20 competitors, 19 men and 1 woman, took part in 24 events in 6 sports.

Athletics

Men's 3000m Steeplechase:
 Manuel F. Oliveira — qualifiers: 8th (heat 1)

Fencing

Four fencers, all men, represented Portugal in 1968.

Men's épée
 Francisco da Silva — 1st round: 7th (poule D)
 João de Abreu — 1st round: 5th (poule G)
 José Pinheiro — 1st round: 5th (poule C)

Men's team épée
 Francisco da Silva, Hélder Reis, João de Abreu and José Pinheiro — 2nd round: 2nd (poule B)

Gymnastics

Men's Individual All-Round Competition:
 José Filipe Abreu — 82nd (104,90 points)
 Floor — 51st (18,00)
 Pommelled Horse — 94th (15,50)
 Rings — 47th (18,00)
 Vault — 71st (17,95)
 Parallel Bars — 88th (17,60)
 Horizontal Bar — 99th (16,90)

Women's Individual All-Round Competition:
 Esbela Fonseca — 85th (66,70 points)
 Floor — 71st (17,35)
 Asymmetrical Bars — 72nd (16,95)
 Balance Beam — 91st (15,45)
 Vault — 88th (16,95)

Sailing

Dragon:
 Melo Menezes (helm), Fernando Lima and Sarafana Weck — 17th (124 points)

Finn:
 Bernardo Santos — 31st (196 points)

Flying Dutchman:
 Adriano da Silva and Orlando Sena (helm) — 27th (178 points)

Star:
 José Quina and Mário Quina (helm) — 17th (119 points)

Weightlifting

Featherweight:
 Luís Ramos — disqualified

Wrestling

Flyweight (–52 kg):
 Leonel Duarte — 2nd round

Bantamweight (–57 kg):
 Luís Grilo — 2nd round

Featherweight (–63 kg):
 Adriano Morais — 2nd round

Lightweight (–70 kg):
 Luís Galantinho — 3rd round

Officials
 Raul Worm (chief of mission)
 Bernardo Mendes de Almeida (sailing)

References

Notes
Mexico City Organizing Committee of the Games of the XIX Olympiad (1969). Official Report of the XIX Olympiad Volume 3: The Games (Retrieved on November 7, 2006)

Nations at the 1968 Summer Olympics
1968
1968 in Portuguese sport